Acmispon decumbens is a species of flowering plant in the family Fabaceae, native to the western United States (Nevada, California) and north-western Mexico (Baja California). It was first described by George Bentham in 1836 as Hosackia decumbens.

It grows in several types of habitat, including mountain forest and meadows. It is a spreading or mat-forming perennial herb coated in long hairs. It is lined with leaves each made up of small green oval leaflets. The inflorescence bears up 12 pinkish yellow pealike flowers each a centimeter long or more. The fruit is a slender, bent, beaked legume pod.

Varieties
Two varieties are recognized:
Acmispon decumbens var. decumbens; synonyms include Acmispon nevadensis (S.Watson) Brouillet, Hosackia heermannii L.C.Anderson, Syrmatium nevadense (S.Watson) Greene
Acmispon decumbens var. davidsonii (Greene) Govaerts; synonyms include Lotus davidsonii Greene

References

decumbens
Flora of California
Flora of Nevada
Flora of Northeastern Mexico
Plants described in 1836
Flora without expected TNC conservation status